Flying Boat Training Squadron RAF is a former Squadron of the Royal Air Force which was operational between 1931 and 1956 through various names.

Structure

The squadron was formed on 2 January 1939 at RAF Calshot flying Supermarine Stranraers and Supermarine Scapas before being disbanded and merged with the Seaplane Training Squadron to make No. 4 (Coastal) Operational Training Unit on 16 March 1941.

History of the Seaplane Training Squadron

The squadron was formed on 1 October 1931 at Calshot by redesignating the Seaplane Training Flight operating a variety of aircraft including Fairey IIID, Supermarine Southamptons and Swordfishs until it was disbanded at RAF Wig Bay.

History of No. 4 OTU

No. 4 (Coastal) OTU was formed on 16 March 1941 at RAF Stranraer and operating a large number of aircraft including Saro Londons, Short Singapores and Consolidated PBY Catalinas. It was disbanded on 31 July 1947 at RAF Pembroke Dock to become No. 235 Operational Conversion Unit RAF.

History of No. 235 OCU

The Conversion unit was formed at RAF Calshot and operated Short Sunderlands and Short Seafords until 17 October 1953 when it was disbanded at Calshot.

Reformation

The squadron was reformed at RAF Pembroke Dock on 17 October 1953 flying Sunderlands before being disbanded less than 3 years later on 5 October 1956 still at Pembroke Dock.

Notes

References 

Royal Air Force aircraft squadrons
Flying training squadrons
Military units and formations disestablished in 1956
Seaplanes